The Temptations Do the Temptations is an album by the Temptations, released in 1976 via Gordy Records. The Temptations' Motown contract was terminated after the release of the album.

This was the last album that
Dennis Edwards was on 
before he was fired from the group
for the first time.

The group enjoyed the greatest creative control of their career, producing and writing most of the tracks. The album received virtually no promotional support from Motown, which didn't like that the Temptations had such creative freedom over the album.

After four unsuccessful years at Atlantic Records, the group would return to Motown for twenty-four more years.

Track listing

Side One
"Why Can't You and Me Get Together" (lead singers: Glenn Leonard, Richard Street, Melvin Franklin) - 4:54
"Who Are You (and What Are You Doing With The Rest Of Your Life)" (lead singer: Dennis Edwards) - 4:34
"I'm On Fire (Body Song)" (lead singer: Glenn Leonard) - 4:24
"Put Your Trust In Me, Baby" (lead singer: Glenn Leonard, Dennis Edwards, Melvin Franklin) - 3:58

Side Two
"There Is No Stopping (Til We Set The Whole World Rockin')" Producer/Writer/Arranger Michael Lovesmith (lead singers: Dennis Edwards, Richard Street, Melvin Franklin) - 5:02
"Let Me Count The Ways (I Love You)" (lead singer: Melvin Franklin, Glenn Leonard, Richard Street, Otis Williams) - 3:57
"Is There Anybody Else" (lead singer: Glenn Leonard) - 4:55
"I'll Take You In" Producer/Writer/Arranger Michael Lovesmith (lead singer: Dennis Edwards) - 5:01

Personnel
 Dennis Edwards - tenor/baritone vocals
 Glenn Leonard - first tenor/falsetto vocals
 Richard Street - tenor/baritone vocals
 Melvin Franklin - bass vocals
 Otis Williams - second tenor/baritone vocals

Engineer [Assistant] – "Sweet Baby" Jane Clark
Engineer [Mixing] – Cal Harris
Engineer [Recording] – Art Stewart, Cal Harris
Musicians:
Eddie "Bongo" Brown- percussionist
Henry Davis-Bassist
James Gadson-Drummer
John "Special Effects" Barnes-Keyboardist
Melvin "Wah Wah" Ragin-Guitarist
Photography By – Norman Seeff
Producer – Michael L. Smith (tracks: A1, A4), Suzee Ikeda (tracks: A1 to A4, B2, B3)

References

1976 albums
The Temptations albums
Gordy Records albums